Dominic Lokinyomo Lobalu (born 16 August 1998) is a South Sudanese middle and long-distance runner. He currently lives and trains in Switzerland and competes for On Running.

Lobalu left South Sudan when he was 8 and took refuge in Kenya. He took up running at the age of 15, and trained as part of the Athlete Refugee Team. He competed for the team in the 1500 metres at the 2017 World Championships in Athletics. In May 2019, he competed in the Geneva Marathon and decided to permanently settle in Switzerland.

In 2022, he set South Sudanese national records in the 1500 metres, 3000 metres, 5000 metres and 10,000 metres. He won the 3000 m at the BAUHAUS-galan in Stockholm, Sweden setting a world leading time of 7:29.48.

References

External links
 

1998 births
Living people
South Sudanese male long-distance runners
South Sudanese male middle-distance runners
Diamond League winners
South Sudanese refugees